The fifth USS Petrel (ASR-14) was a Chanticleer-class submarine rescue ship in the United States Navy.

Petrel was laid down on 26 February 1945, was built by Savannah Machine Foundry Co., Savannah, Georgia; launched on 26 September 1945, sponsored by Mrs. Effie Jeffreys (in honour of her son, MMC Romie L. Jeffreys, who died along with all hands on the submarine  on 11 February 1942), and commissioned at Savannah on 24 September 1946.

Service history

1946–1949
After fitting out at Charleston, South Carolina and shakedown at Guantanamo and Panama Bays, Petrel returned to Charleston on 18 December 1946.

1950–1959
Departing New London on 23 January 1950, she steamed off Old Point Comfort, Virginia, where the battleship  had run aground. Divers from Petrel surveyed and excavated around the bottom of the battleship, and on 1 February Petrel aided in the "big pull" that drew Missouri into deep water. After this operation, Petrel returned to New London on 6 February, but was reassigned to Key West on 5 May.

Petrel continued training operations, with SubRon 4, at Key West throughout the 1950s, with occasional variations. Exercises in 1952 included re-floating the U–2513. In 1956, Petrel had a key role in freeing Nantahala, aground in Key West Channel.

On 14 February 1958, Petrel received a distress call at Key West from the submarine , stranded in heavy seas off San Salvador, Bahama Islands. Steaming to the area and off-loading some of Guavina's oil cargo, Petrel towed the lightened submarine to Key West.

1960–1969
Petrel continued to operate along the Atlantic coast of the southern United States until sailing in early 1961 for the Mediterranean for exercises with SubDiv 41, 6th Fleet in June and operated off Portugal in salvage operations after a DC-8 passenger airplane crash. Petrel returned to Charleston on 28 August for coastal operations until she again joined the 6th Fleet from January to May 1964. She departed Charleston on 12 July for Hamilton, Bermuda, where she aided the U.S. Air Force in recovering wreckage and personnel from a two-plane, mid-air collision.

On 17 January, an Air Force B-52, carrying four unarmed  Mk.28 nuclear bombs, collided with a KC-135 off Palomares, Spain. Petrel was sent to the area to aid in salvage operations and had the delicate task of maintaining position over the bomb. Petrel then returned to Charleston.

Deployed to the Mediterranean again in 1968, Petrel searched for the lost Israeli submarine  on 26 January, and missing  on the 30th. On 12 February, she helped salvage destroyer  at Rhodes, Greece. After return to Charleston in May, she joined in the search for missing submarine  on the 27th, and returned to Charleston from the Azores on 12 July. She continued operations with SubDiv 41 into 1970.

[1970-1991]

Petrel was decommissioned on 30 September 1991, and struck from the Naval Vessel Register on 9 October 1991. Laid up in the Atlantic Reserve Fleet, Petrel was transferred to MARAD custody on 1 May 1999, for lay up in the National Defense Reserve Fleet, at James River, Virginia. A contract for scrapping was awarded to Bay Bridge Enterprises of Chesapeake, Virginia, and the ship was towed from the James River on 5 December 2003.

References
Notes

Bibliography

External links
 

 

Chanticleer-class submarine rescue ships
Ships built in Savannah, Georgia
1945 ships